The 1994 Southern Conference baseball tournament was held at College Park in Charleston, South Carolina, from April 28 through May 1. Fifth seeded The Citadel won the tournament and earned the Southern Conference's automatic bid to the 1994 NCAA Division I baseball tournament. It was the Bulldogs second tournament win and first under coach Fred Jordan.

The tournament used a double-elimination format. Only the top eight teams participate, so Furman was not in the field.

Seeding

Bracket

All-Tournament Team

References 

Tournament
Southern Conference Baseball Tournament
Southern Conference baseball tournament
Southern Conference baseball tournament
Southern Conference baseball tournament